Ji Jong-gu (born 2 December 1969) is a South Korean sports shooter. He competed in the men's 10 metre air rifle event at the 1992 Summer Olympics.

References

1969 births
Living people
South Korean male sport shooters
Olympic shooters of South Korea
Shooters at the 1992 Summer Olympics
Place of birth missing (living people)